HMS Pique was a wooden fifth-rate sailing frigate of the Royal Navy, designed by Sir William Symonds. She was launched on 21 July 1834 at Devonport.  The vessel was of 1,633 tons burthen and had 36 guns. She was broken up in 1910.

Service history
Pique was the first of a new class of medium-sized frigates designed by Sir William Symonds, Chief Surveyor of the Navy. Following commissioning she formed part of an experimental squadron, which were groups of ships sent out in the 1830s and 1840s to test new techniques of ship design, armament, building and propulsion.

In September 1835 she ran ashore in the Strait of Belle Isle. She was refloated and crossed the Atlantic rudderless and taking on water. In October the vessel arrived in Portsmouth for repairs where a large rock, which had plugged the hole in her hull, was removed. This stone remains on display in the Porter's Garden, Portsmouth Historic Dockyard.

In 1840 Pique saw service in the bombardment of the city of Acre under the command of Admiral Robert Stopford. For the engagement, Pique was assigned to the far northern end of the line, north-northeast of the much larger  and at a greater distance from the city than the rest of Stopford's fleet. Despite this unfavourable position, accurate gunnery enabled Pique to score several hits on the town.

Between 1841 and 1846 Pique served on the North America and West Indies Station.  With HMS Blake, in 1845 she acted as a cable ship for experiments in laying telegraph cable in Portsmouth Harbour. From 26 December 1853 she was commanded by Captain Frederick Nicolson on the Pacific Station, and participated in the 1854 Anglo-French squadron sent to the Russian War and Second Anglo-Chinese War). She was present at the Siege of Petropavlovsk.

From 1872 she was a receiving ship, and from 1882 rented as a hospital hulk to Plymouth Borough Council to quarantine sailors who had fallen victim to a cholera epidemic.

Fate
Pique was sold for scrap on 12 July 1910, raising £2,300.

References

Bibliography

External links

http://www.nmm.ac.uk/collections/prints/viewPrint.cfm?ID=PAG7142
http://www.nmm.ac.uk/collections/prints/viewPrint.cfm?ID=PAD6161
http://www.pdavis.nl/ShowShip.php?id=1895

Hospital ships of the United Kingdom
Ships built in Plymouth, Devon
1834 ships
Cable ships of the United Kingdom
Crimean War naval ships of the United Kingdom
Fifth-rate frigates of the Royal Navy